Hasan Fehmi Güneş (1934 – 23 November 2021) was a Turkish jurist and politician who served as the interior minister in 1979. He was a member of the Turkish parliament for two terms from the Republican People's Party. Between 1975 and 1980 he served in the Turkish Senate.

Biography
Güneş was born in Adapazarı in 1934. He graduated from Ankara University receiving a bachelor's degree in law. After working as a lawyer and public prosecutor, he entered politics and became senator in the period 1975–1980. He was a member of the Turkish parliament for two terms, in the 18th and 22nd terms, from the Social Democratic Populist Party and then from the Republican People's Party. On 13 January 1979 he was appointed interior minister to the cabinet led by Prime Minister Bülent Ecevit. His term witnessed significant events, including the assassination of journalist Abdi İpekçi, arrest of the assassin, Mehmet Ali Ağca, and attack by the members of the Palestine Liberation Organization against the Egyptian Embassy in Ankara. He resigned from the office in late September 1979 following the media reports about his affair with an actress. 

Güneş was elected to the Parliament in the 1987 general election from the Social Democratic Populist Party. He run for the presidency of the Republican People's Party on 30 September 2000, but he lost the election to Deniz Baykal.

Güneş was married and had two children. He died in Ankara on 23 November 2021. He was buried in his hometown, Karapürçek, Sakarya, on 25 November.

References

External links

20th-century Turkish lawyers
1934 births
2021 deaths
20th-century jurists
People from Adapazarı
Ministers of the Interior of Turkey
Ankara University Faculty of Law alumni
Deputies of Istanbul
Members of the 18th Parliament of Turkey
Members of the 22nd Parliament of Turkey
Republican People's Party (Turkey) politicians
Members of the Senate of the Republic (Turkey)